The 2015 Bursa Cup was a professional tennis tournament played on outdoor clay courts. It was the first edition of the tournament and part of the 2015 ITF Women's Circuit, offering a total of $50,000 in prize money. It took place in Bursa, Turkey, on 6–12 June 2015.

Singles main draw entrants

Seeds 

 1 Rankings as of 29 June 2015

Other entrants 
The following players received wildcards into the singles main draw:
  Ayla Aksu
  Başak Eraydın
  Deniz Paykoç
  Melis Sezer

The following players received entry from the qualifying draw:
  Lina Gjorcheska
  Ganna Poznikhirenko
  Caroline Roméo
  Raluca Georgiana Șerban

The following player received entry by a protected ranking:
  Mihaela Buzărnescu

Champions

Singles

 İpek Soylu def.  Anastasija Sevastova, 7–5, 3–6, 6–1

Doubles

 Marina Melnikova /  Laura Pous Tió def.  Sofia Shapatava /  Anastasiya Vasylyeva, 6–4, 6–4

External links 
 2015 Bursa Cup at ITFtennis.com
 Official website 

2015 ITF Women's Circuit
2015 in Turkish tennis
2015